Lingua Franca is a 2019 drama film written and directed by Isabel Sandoval. The film stars Sandoval, Lynn Cohen, Eamon Farren, Lev Gorn, and Ivory Aquino. The plot follows an undocumented Filipina trans woman who works as a caregiver for Olga, an elderly Russian woman in Brooklyn's Brighton Beach. When Olivia runs out of options to attain legal status in the US, she becomes romantically involved with Alex, Olga's adult grandson, in the pursuit of a marriage-based green card. Lingua Franca premiered at the Venice Days sidebar of the 2019 Venice Film Festival. In July 2020, the film was acquired by Ava Duvernay's distribution company ARRAY and was later released on Netflix on August 26.

Plot 
Olivia is a Filipina trans woman who works as a live-in caregiver for the elderly Olga in Brooklyn's Brighton Beach neighborhood. Olga, a Russian-Jewish woman, is in the early stages of dementia and relies on Olivia to confirm her surroundings, which she initially suspects is not her own home. As an undocumented immigrant, Olivia harbors fears of being detained and deported by ICE agents at any moment. Olivia's earnings go towards supporting her family in the Philippines, in addition to installment payments to Matthew, her American-born boyfriend, with the hope of Olivia securing a green card through a marriage of convenience. Olivia's plans are disrupted just as Alex, Olga's adult grandson, arrives to come live with Olga after a stay in rehab.

While Olivia is patient with Olga and understands Olga's needs, Alex is hotheaded and doesn't know how to handle his grandmother's care. Alex tries to maintain his sobriety and secures work at his uncle's slaughterhouse. Olivia and Alex form a bond despite their differences, and one night Olivia fantasizes about Alex after he reads his late grandfather's love letters out loud. She confides to him about her undocumented status and how she would need a green card in order to stay in America, which Alex is sympathetic to. The two enter into a romantic relationship, with Alex unaware of Olivia being trans.

Alex brings home a drunken male friend, Andrei, who snoops around Olivia's room and steals her money while she is in the shower. Here Andrei discovers Olivia's passport which reveals Olivia's pre-op identity. Andrei shows the passport to Alex, who does not disclose his relationship with Olivia and instead tells Andrei to keep quiet. Alex does not tell Olivia he knows she's trans. When Olivia realizes her belongings were rummaged through, Alex makes up a story that a masked intruder went through her things, increasing Olivia's fear that ICE will do a raid on her. Alex shows up to his job at the slaughterhouse drunk and is fired on the spot by his uncle. Although Alex is initially distant from Olivia, he eventually comforts her after he sees her watching the nonstop news on TV about ongoing immigration raids and deportations. He considers marrying her and looks up marriage license procedures in New York state online. He gets his job back with his uncle after promising to stay sober. While on a overnight trip to Atlantic City, Alex drunkenly offers to marry Olivia the next day and talks about his wishes to have a big family with her. Olivia is hesitant and tells Alex she has something to tell him, but he reassures her that he already knows about her being trans and would still marry her. The next morning in their motel room, Olivia demands that Alex return her passport to her. The ending is left ambiguous; though it is understood Olivia has decided not to go through with the marriage, as she tells her mom in the Philippines she has a new job and has met someone new, with her earnings again going towards financially supporting her family and securing a green card. The film ends with Olga again forgetting her surroundings.

Cast 
 Isabel Sandoval as Olivia 
 Lynn Cohen as Olga
 Eamon Farren as Alex
 Lev Gorn as Murray
 Ivory Aquino as Trixie
 P.J. Boudousqué as Andrei
 Andrea Leigh as Daria

Reception 
The film was received positively. The film has  rating on Rotten Tomatoes, with the consensus: "Lingua Franca brings warmth and humanity to its social issue-driven plot with sensitive performances and writer-director Isabel Sandoval's gently empathetic touch." Stephanie Zacharek wrote for Time that Lingua Franca is "a gorgeous and delicate picture, an understated work that opens a window on an intimate world" and Jude Dry wrote in IndieWire that the film "illustrates the woefully untapped potential of marginalized storytellers". For The Hollywood Reporter, Stephen Dalton wrote Lingua Franca is a "heartfelt personal statement rooted in timely, gripping issues that obviously resonate deeply with its author, notably trans rights and Trump-era immigration anxieties".

Lingua Franca was nominated for the 2021 GLAAD Media Award for Outstanding Film (Limited Release).

References

External links 
 

2019 films
2019 LGBT-related films
Films about trans women
Brighton Beach
Films about immigration to the United States
English-language Netflix original films
Philippine LGBT-related films
Asian-American LGBT-related films
Films about Filipino women
2019 drama films
2019 independent films
Asian-American drama films
Films about Filipino Americans
2010s American films